Iseo was a municipality in the district of Lugano in the canton of Ticino in Switzerland.  It was incorporated into the comune of Bioggio in 2008.

References

Former municipalities of Ticino